Pseudoeryx is a genus of snakes of the subfamily Dipsadinae.

Species
 Pseudoeryx plicatilis (Linnaeus, 1758)
 Pseudoeryx relictualis Schargel, Rivas-Fuenmayor, Barros, Péfaur & Navarette, 2007

References

Dipsadinae
Snake genera
Snakes of South America
Taxa named by Leopold Fitzinger